Han Xinyun and Darija Jurak were the defending champions but both players chose not to participate.

Cori Gauff and Caty McNally won the title, defeating Maria Sanchez and Fanny Stollár in the final, 6–2, 6–2.

Seeds

Draw

Draw

References

External Links
Main Draw

Citi Open - Doubles